Hagener Township is one of eleven townships in Cass County, Illinois, USA.  As of the 2020 census, its population was 352 and it contained 157 housing units.

Geography

Unincorporated towns
 Hagener
(This list is based on USGS data and may include former settlements.)

Cemeteries
The township contains these seven cemeteries: Black Oak, Bush, Hackman, Immanuel Lutheran, Saint Peters Lutheran, Schneider and Wagle.

Major highways
  US Route 67
  Illinois Route 100

Airports and landing strips
 Kinsey RLA Airport
 Kloker Airport
 Phillip H Krohe Airport

Rivers
 Illinois River

Lakes
 Meredosia Lake

Demographics
As of the 2020 census there were 352 people, 147 households, and 134 families residing in the township. The racial makeup of the township was 86.93% White, 0.57% African American, 0.57% Native American, 0.57% Asian, 0.28% Pacific Islander, 5.97% from other races, and 5.11% from two or more races. Hispanic or Latino of any race were 10.51% of the population.

There were 147 households, out of which 46.90% had children under the age of 18 living with them, 89.12% were married couples living together, 0.00% had a female householder with no spouse present, and 8.84% were non-families. 2.00% of all households were made up of individuals, and 2.00% had someone living alone who was 65 years of age or older. The average household size was 3.58 and the average family size was 3.72.

The township's age distribution consisted of 35.9% under the age of 18, 2.5% from 18 to 24, 25.9% from 25 to 44, 19.4% from 45 to 64, and 16.3% who were 65 years of age or older. The median age was 35.5 years. For every 100 females, there were 84.6 males. For every 100 females age 18 and over, there were 111.9 males.

The median income for a household in the township was $107,656, and the median income for a family was $109,688. Males had a median income of $49,018 versus $39,143 for females. The per capita income for the township was $25,872. About 1.5% of families and 3.2% of the population were below the poverty line, including 0.0% of those under age 18 and 5.8% of those age 65 or over.

School districts
 Beardstown Community Unit School District 15
 Meredosia-Chambersburg Community Unit School District 11
 Triopia Community Unit School District 27

Political districts
 Illinois' 18th congressional district
 State House District 93
 State Senate District 47

References
 
 United States Census Bureau 2007 TIGER/Line Shapefiles
 United States National Atlas

External links

 City-Data.com
 Illinois State Archives

Townships in Cass County, Illinois
Townships in Illinois
1923 establishments in Illinois